Czyżewski (feminine: Czyżewska; plural: Czyżewscy) is a Polish surname, derived from the Polish word "czyż", meaning "siskin". Surnames of similar derivations include Czyż and Czyżowicz, Chyzheuski or Čyžeŭski (from ), Chyzhevskyy (from ), and Chizhevsky (from ). The surname may refer to:

 Elżbieta Czyżewska (1938–2010), Polish actress
 Krzysztof Czyżewski (born 1958), Polish author
 Tytus Czyżewski (1880–1945), Polish painter
 Zygmunt Czyżewski (1910–1998), Polish football player and manager

See also
 

Polish-language surnames